La Paz Municipality may refer to:
La Paz Municipality, Bolivia
La Paz Municipality, Baja California Sur

Municipality name disambiguation pages